"When We Come Alive" is a song by American alternative rock band Switchfoot from their ninth studio album, Fading West. It was released to modern rock radio stations as the fourth single from the album on May 13, 2014. KXOJ-FM remixed it for its stations. "When We Come Alive" was written by Jon Foreman, Tim Foreman, Drew Pearson and David Hodges.

A music video for the song was released onto YouTube on September 9, 2014. It was directed by Derec Dunn.

Charts

References

Switchfoot songs
2013 songs
2014 singles
Songs written by Jon Foreman
Atlantic Records singles
Songs written by Tim Foreman
Songs written by Drew Pearson (songwriter)
Songs written by David Hodges
Song recordings produced by Neal Avron